Michael Stearns is a musician and composer.

Michael Stearns may also refer to:
Mike Stearns, 1632 series character
Michael Stearns (artist) (born 1940), American painter, sculptor and curator